Der Trompeter von Säckingen (The Trumpeter of Säckingen) is an opera in a prologue and three acts by Viktor Nessler.

Performance history
It was Nessler's greatest success, albeit in part because of the popularity of von Scheffel's poem. It was subsequently given at the Metropolitan Opera in New York City on 23 November 1887, and at the Theatre Royal, Drury Lane, in London on 8 July 1892 by the Hamburg Stadttheater, conducted by Leo Feld.

Roles

Synopsis 
Setting: 17th-century Heidelberg and Säkkingen, after the Thirty Years' War. The trumpeter Werner loves Maria, the daughter of the Baron, but her father and mother want her to marry the cowardly Damian. Werner proves himself a hero and is opportunely discovered to be of noble birth, so all ends happily.

Recordings 
 Nessler: Der Trompeter von Säckingen – WDR Rundfunkorchester Köln and Chorus, conductor: Helmuth Froschauer, Alfred Kuhn (bass); Christoph Späth (tenor);  (bass); Hermann Prey (baritone); Katharina Kammerloher (mezzo-soprano); 2013 [1994] Capriccio C5187 (CD)

Sources 

 
 Franklin, Peter (1992), "Trompeter von Säckingen, Der" in The New Grove Dictionary of Opera, ed. Stanley Sadie (London)

External links 
 
 Der Trompeter von Säckingen website
 , Richard Tauber.

German-language operas
Operas by Viktor Nessler
1884 operas
Operas
Operas set in Germany
Operas set in the 17th century
Operas based on literature
Music dedicated to ensembles or performers
Music dedicated to family or friends